Year 1257 (MCCLVII) was a common year starting on Monday (link will display the full calendar) of the Julian calendar.

Events 
 By place 

 Europe 
 Spring – The Epirote–Nicaean conflict begins between the Despotate of Epirus and the Empire of Nicaea. Despot Michael II Komnenos Doukas revolts and defeats the Nicaean army under George Akropolites. The Epirote and Serbian forces join their attacks against Michael, who sends his forces into Macedonia and marches on Thessalonica. In response, Michael is attacked – on the west coast of Epirus – by Manfred of Sicily. Manfred first occupies the major Ionian Islands, including Corfu. Then he lands on the Albanian coast and takes Durazzo, Berat, Valona and their environs.
 January 13 – At the first recorded meeting of the college of the seven Electors of the Holy Roman Empire, the 48-year-old Richard of Cornwall (the brother of King Henry III of England) is elected King of the Romans. He is crowned at Aachen, on May 17. His candidacy is opposed by King Alfonso X (the Wise), Pope Alexander IV and King Louis IX (the Saint) favour Alfonso, but both are ultimately convinced by Richard's sister-in-law, Queen Eleanor of Provence, to support Richard.
 The pagan Karelians start a destructive expedition to Sweden in which King Valdemar requests Alexander IV to declare a crusade against them. This leads to the Third Swedish Crusade to Finland (see 1293).

 British Isles 
 Battle of Cadfan: An English expeditionary army under Stephen Bauzan is ambushed and defeated by Welsh forces. The English are decimated by devastating guerilla attacks and the Welsh capture the English supply train. Stephen Bauzan is killed along with some 1,000–3,000 of his men. The remaining English flee the battle, Prince Llywelyn ap Gruffudd is said to have been present at the battle, collecting spoils from the fallen English army. According to sources, it is one of the greatest victories of a Welsh army in the field against a much more powerful English force.
 King Henry III orders the production of a twenty pence, English coin of pure gold. Unfortunately, the bullion value of the coins is about 20% higher than the nominal face value, leading to poor circulation, as coins are melted down by individuals for their gold content.
 Henry III relents to the demands of his son Edward (the Lord Edward) for assistance to fight the Welsh (see 1256). He joins him on a campaign to retake the territories lost to the Welsh forces led by Llywelyn ap Gruffudd.
 Battle of Creadran Cille: Norman invading forces under Maurice FitzGerald are driven out by Gofraid O'Donnell in northern Connacht. Later, FitzGerald is killed in personal combat by O'Donnell, on May 20.

 Levant 
 Venetian–Genoese War: The Venetian fleet under Admiral Lorenzo Tiepolo breaks through the harbour chain at Acre and destroys several Genoese ships. He also attacks the fortifications but Tiepolo is unable to expel the Genoese garrison (some 800 men strong and armed with 50–60 ballistae), from their quarter of the city throwing up a blockade.
 April 10 – Izz al-Din Aybak, Mamluk sultan of Egypt, is murdered on orders of his wife, Shajar al-Durr. He is succeeded by his 14-year-old son, Nur al-Din Ali, as ruler of the Mamluk Sultanate (until 1259).

 Mongol Empire 
 Spring – Mongol forces under Uriyangkhadai conduct a campaign against local Yi and Lolo tribes in Vietnam. He returns to Gansu and sends messengers to the court of Möngke Khan informing him that Yunnan is firmly under Mongolian control. Möngke Khan honors and rewards Uriyangkhadai for his military achievements.
 Winter – Mongol forces move down from their base at Hamadan, while Baiju Noyan crosses the Tigris River at Mosul with his army. On the left-wing Kitbuqa enters the plain of Iraq, while Mongol forces under Hulagu Khan advance through Kermanshah.

 Asia 
 March – The Japanese Kōgen era ends and the Shōka era begins during the reign of the 14-year-old Emperor Go-Fukakusa (until 1259).

 By topic 

 City and Towns 
 June 5 – The city of Kraków is granted Magdeburg rights by High Duke Bolesław V (the Chaste), having been rebuilt after being nearly destroyed during the Mongol invasion of Poland.

 Education 
 Louis IX (the Saint) confirms the foundation by his chaplain Robert de Sorbon of the College of Sorbonne in Paris, giving a formal college (and still-common name) to the already existing University of Paris.

 Literature 
 Matthew Paris, English monk and chronicler, personally interviews Henry III for an entire week while compiling his major work of English history, Chronica Majora.

 Natural Disaster 
 Samalas eruption: Mount Samalas volcano erupts on Lombok Island, Indonesia. One of the largest volcanic eruptions in the past 10,000 years, it creates severe climatic changes across the globe, leading to severe famine and death, and to one of the biggest geopolitical changes across the globe over the next few centuries.

Births 
 March 24 – Yolanda I, French noblewoman (d. 1314)
 August 15 – Muhammad III, ruler of Granada (d. 1314)
 October 14 – Przemysł II, king of Poland (d. 1296)
 Agnes of Brandenburg, queen of Denmark (d. 1304)
 Beatrice of Burgundy, French noblewoman (d. 1310)
 Frederick I (the Brave), German nobleman (d. 1323)
 Malise III of Strathearn, Scottish nobleman (d. 1312)
 Parsoma (the Naked), Egyptian Coptic hermit (d. 1317)
 Philip III of Falkenstein, count of Münzenberg (d. 1322)
 Robert de Vere, English nobleman and knight (d. 1331)
 William Russell, English nobleman and knight (d. 1311)

Deaths 
 April 10 – Izz al-Din Aybak, ruler of the Mamluk Sultanate
 April 26 – Euphemia de Walliers, English nun and abbess
 May 3 – Katherine of England, English princess (b. 1253)
 May 5 – Haakon the Young, junior king of Norway (b. 1232)
 May 17 – Choe Hang, Korean general and dictator (b. 1209)
 May 20 – Maurice FitzGerald, Norman nobleman and knight
 June 4 – Przemysł I, Polish nobleman and co-ruler (b. 1221)
 June 8 – Simon of Elmham, English prior and bishop-elect 
 August 15 – Hyacinth of Poland, Polish missionary (b. 1185)
 December 24 – John of Avesnes, count of Hainaut  (b. 1218)
 December 26 – Richard Blund (or Blundy), English bishop
 Lanfranc Cigala (or Cicala), Genoese nobleman and knight
 Maria of Antioch-Armenia, Outremer noblewoman (b. 1215)
 Matilda I, countess of Nevers, Auxerre and Tonnerre (b. 1188)
 Mohammad Baba as-Samasi, Abbasid Sufi leader (b. 1195)
 Roger Weseham, English bishop of Coventry and Lichfield
 Sartaq Khan (or Sartak), Mongol ruler of the Golden Horde
 Stephen Bauzan, English nobleman, seneschal and knight
 Valdemar III (Abelsøn), Danish prince and heir apparent
 Willikin of the Weald, English warrior and guerrilla leader
 Yuan Haowen, Chinese politician, poet and writer (b. 1190)

References